Ken Plummer (4 April 1946 – 4 November 2022) was a British sociologist. He was a professor of sociology at the University of Essex for 30 years.

Books
Sexual Stigma (1975)
The Making of the Modern Homosexual (1981)
Telling Sexual Stories (1995)
Documents of Life (2001)
Intimate Citizenship (2003)
Sociology: The Basics (2010)

References

External links
Official website

1946 births
2022 deaths
British sociologists
Academics of the University of Essex